The Flying Monster is a 1984 Korean kaiju film directed by Kim Jeong-Yong.

Plot 
Dr. Kim (Kim Ki-Ju) a mad scientist teams up with a young reporter named Kang Ok-hee (Nam Hye-Gyeong) to prove that dinosaurs still exist. When giant dinosaurs (and a giant bird-like Pterodactylus) suddenly appear, the doctor and journalist must find a way to save the world.

Cast 

 Kim Ki-Ju as Dr. Kim
 Nam Hye-Gyeong as Kang Ok-hee, reporter
 Kim Da-hye as Sohee
 Moon Tae-Seon

Production 
The Flying Monster utilizes extensive stock footage of monsters from four Tsuburaya Productions TV series: Ultraman (Pestar), Return of Ultraman (Seagorath, Seamons, Bemstar, and Terochilus), Ultraman Ace (Verokron) and Fireman (Dorigon), as well as the 1971 Taiwanese film The Founding of Ming Dynasty (two unnamed dragons).

Release 
The Flying Monster was released in South Korea on January 12, 1985. The film was never released in the United States until SRS Cinema released the film on VHS and Blu-ray on January 21, 2021 as War of the God Monsters.

Notes

References

External links 

 
 

1985 films
1980s Korean-language films
South Korean science fiction films
Kaiju films
Giant monster films
Films about dinosaurs
1980s Japanese films